Fuscopannaria dispersa is a species of corticolous (bark-dwelling),  in the family Pannariaceae. It was formally described as a new species in 2000 by Norwegian lichenologist Per Magnus Jørgensen. The type specimen was collected by Joseph Rock from the eastern slopes of Likang Snow Range (Yangtze watershed, Yunnan) in 1922, and has since been documented in a few locations in eastern China. The lichen has a brown thallus made of small squamules (up to 2 mm in diameter) spread out over a distinct black prothallus. Its ascospores are ellipsoid, colourless, lack septa, and measure 15–17 by 9–10 μm. Fuscopannaria dispersa is similar to the more widespread F. leucosticta (the type species of genus Fuscopannaria), but can be distinguished from that species by the squamulose form of its thallus and by its smaller, rounder ascospores.

References

dispersa
Lichen species
Lichens described in 2000
Taxa named by Per Magnus Jørgensen
Lichens of China